Fourth ballot box may refer to:

Honduran fourth ballot box referendum, a political initiative of Honduran president Manuel Zelaya
Nicaraguan fourth ballot box, a political initiative by Nicaraguan president Daniel Ortega